John Dhani Lennevald (born 24 July 1984 in Stockholm) is a Swedish songwriter, record producer, and formerly a Pop/R&B dancer and singer.  He was a member of the Swedish pop band A*Teens from 1998 to 2004, and briefly pursued a solo recording career after the band dissolved.

Career

A-Teens (1998–2004)
In 1998, at the age of 14, Lennevald signed a record deal with Stockholm Records (part of Universal Music Group) along with his then band mates, Sara, Marie, and Amit. Together they performed as the A-Teens. In 1999, they released their first single, a cover of the legendary band ABBA, Mamma Mia. The single topped the charts in Sweden for 8 consecutive weeks and was successful in other countries.

By 2000, the A-Teens' first album, The ABBA Generation had sold 4 million copies and they became one of the most successful Swedish bands around the world.

After 6 years together and more than 9 million albums sold, the A-Teens parted ways after their Greatest Hits album and their final tour together in Sweden.

Solo career
After the A-Teens ended in 2004, Lennevald returned to the studio to write and record new songs. "Girl Talk" is the introduction to Lennevald's solo career. 

Lennevald approached the record company with five new songs, just one and a half weeks after the end of the tour. Lennevald created a new sound, assisted by producer Peter Björklund, in which his voice is the prime focus. His first release was the single, "Girl Talk", a kind of tragicomedy about the inability of men to really understand what their girlfriends are trying to say to them.

The video for "Girl Talk", directed by Mikeadelica, was filmed in a sunny Stockholm day, during the middle of August. Also involved in the song and the video were Denmark’s biggest rap artists, Nik & Jay.

"Girl Talk" was released on radio on August 12, 2004 getting high rotation on the most important radio stations in Sweden. The single was released on September 15, 2004 and reached #20 on the Swedish Charts and earned a Gold Certification.

After the release of his single, Lennevald worked as a model, appearing in several fashion magazines and participating in fashion shows in his native Sweden.

In 2005 Lennevald and Universal Music parted ways, and there is no word about another record deal. Also in 2005, a song clip called "Let's Do It Again" leaked on the Internet and Lennevald appeared on shows in Sweden promoting his image and new songs.

Since then, Lennevald has worked as a music producer and songwriter and collaborated with Måns Zelmerlöw, Anton Ewald and Carl Falk.

Personal life 
In 2007, Lennevald was reported to be in a relationship with former glamour model Natacha Peyre. In 2008, the couple relocated from Stockholm to Los Angeles.

Dhani returned to Europe by mid-2010s and Instagram postings of 2021 showed he was in a 1-year relationship with British singer Alice Chater.

Discography

Albums

Singles
2004: "Girls Talk"
2005: "Let's Do It Again"

Featured in
2015: "Sunset Jesus" (Avicii feat. Gavin DeGraw, John Dhani Lennevald, Mike Posner & Sandro Cavazza)

References

External links 
Official Site

1984 births
Living people
Swedish pop singers
21st-century Swedish male singers
A-Teens members
Singers from Stockholm
20th-century Swedish male singers
English-language singers from Sweden
Swedish male models